Aframomum exscapum is a species of plant in the ginger family, Zingiberaceae. It was first described by John Sims and got its current name from Frank Nigel Hepper.

References 

exscapum